Soe Oo is a Burmese politician who currently serves as Minister of Planning and Finance for Sagaing Region and Sagaing Region Parliament MP for Sagaing Township No..1.

Political career
In the 2015 Myanmar general election, he was elected as a Sagaing Region Hluttaw MP, winning a majority of 55205 votes, from Sagaing Township No. 1 parliamentary constituency. Soe Oo also serving as a member of Sagaing Region Investment Committee and Regional minister of Planning and Finance for Sagaing Region.

See also
Sagaing Region Government

References

National League for Democracy politicians
Living people
People from Sagaing Region
Year of birth missing (living people)